Argiusta-Moriccio is a commune in the French department of Corse-du-Sud, collectivity and island of Corsica.

Geography
Argiusta-Moriccio is located 6 km north-east of Petreto-Bicchisano and 8 km south-east of Grosseto-Prugna. Access to the commune is by the D757 road from Bicchisano in the south-west passing through the commune and the village and continuing north-east to Olivese.  Apart from the village there is the hamlet of Moriccio north-west of the village. The commune is heavily forested and mountainous throughout.

The north-western border of the commune is a river flowing to the west.

Neighbouring communes and villages

Administration

List of Successive Mayors

Demography
In 2017 the commune had 76 inhabitants.

Culture and heritage

Civil heritage
The commune has a number of buildings and structures that are registered as historical monuments:
A House at Argiusta (1581)
A House at Moriccio (1777)
A House of a Notable at Argiusta (18th century)
A House of a Notable at Argiusta (1875)
Houses (16th, 18th, & 19th centuries)
The War memorial at Argiusta (1956)

Other sites of interest
Torréen de Foce monument

Religious heritage

The Parish Church of Saint Hippolyte and Saint Cassien (1746) is registered as an historical monument. The Church contains many items that are registered as historical objects:
The complete Secondary Altar of the Virgin (18th century)
The complete Secondary Altar of the Brotherhood of the Rosary (18th century)
A Group Sculpture: Saint Vincent de Paul and two children (19th century)
An Altar Painting: Presenting a Scapular to the saints by the Virgin and child (1870)
A Painting: Meditation of Saint Madeleine (19th century)
An Altar Painting: Donation of the Rosary (18th century)
A Chasuble, Chalice cover, and Stole (19th century)
A Chasuble and 2 Dalmatics (19th century)
A Chasuble, Chalice cover, and Humeral cover (19th century)
A Chalice with Paten (2) (19th century)
A Chalice with Paten (1) (19th century)
The Furniture in the Church

Historical objects in the Church

See also
Communes of the Corse-du-Sud department

References

External links

Argiusta-Moriccio on Géoportail, National Geographic Institute (IGN) website 

Communes of Corse-du-Sud